Yunus Khan (born 1 August 1964), also known as Yoonus Khan, is an Indian politician from Rajasthan. He was a cabinet minister in the government of Rajasthan led by Vasundhara Raje and a leader of Bharatiya Janata Party. He represented the Nagaur district's Didwana in the Rajasthan Legislative Assembly. He was a minister of Public Works and Transport Department.

Personal life
Khan was born to Taju Khan. He is post graduate and did his Master of Commerce from Rajasthan University, Jaipur in 1986. Khan is a farmer by profession.

Political career
In 2018, Rajasthan Assembly Election, Yunus Khan is fielded against Sachin Pilot from Tonk, and lost the elections. Pilot got 109,040 votes and Khan got 54,861.

References

External links
 Member's Profile

1964 births
Living people
People from Nagaur district
State cabinet ministers of Rajasthan
Members of the Rajasthan Legislative Assembly
Bharatiya Janata Party politicians from Rajasthan